The Yokohama Tire LPGA Classic was a women's professional golf tournament on the LPGA Tour. The 72-hole event made its debut  in September 2007 at the Capitol Hill location on the Robert Trent Jones Golf Trail in Prattville, Alabama, a suburb northwest of Montgomery. Maria Hjorth won the inaugural event on the Senator Course by one stroke over Stacy Prammanasudh.

Top-ranked Lorena Ochoa then won consecutive titles, in a playoff in 2008 and by four strokes in 2009. Katherine Hull won in 2010 by a single stroke and set the tournament scoring record at 269 (−19).

The event saw the then youngest-ever winner of an LPGA event in 2011, with Lexi Thompson's five-stroke victory at age 16. (Amateur Lydia Ko lowered the record to age 15 in 2012 in Canada.)  In 2012, Stacy Lewis won her third event of the season by two strokes over Thompson, who carded a 63 (−9) on Thursday, but had a 74 (+2) on Saturday.

The Senator Course at RTJ Capitol Hill converted its greens from bent grass to Champion Bermuda grass in the summer of 2011. The title sponsor was Navistar International, a manufacturer of commercial trucks, engines, and school buses. Following the 2012 event, it elected not to continue as title sponsor, and the tournament was dropped from the schedule in 2013. The tournament reappeared in 2014 when the Yokohama Tire Corporation took over as the title sponsor.

Formerly played later in the season, it was moved up in the schedule to May in 2016. The LPGA Tour event in Mobile, last played as the Airbus LPGA Classic in 2014, was held in May at an RTJ Golf Trail course.

Tournament names
2007: Navistar LPGA Classic
2008: Navistar LPGA Classic Presented by MaxxForce
2009–2011: Navistar LPGA Classic Presented by Monaco RV
2012: Navistar LPGA Classic
2014–2016: Yokohama Tire LPGA Classic

Course layout

Capitol Hill, Senator Course (2014)

Source:

Winners

1 Thompson, age 16, was not an LPGA member at the time of this win in 2011.
2 Won in a three-player sudden-death playoff in 2008 on the second extra hole.

Tournament records

References

External links 

LPGA Tour - official tournament microsite
Robert Trent Jones Golf Trail: Capitol Hill

Former LPGA Tour events
Golf in Alabama
Sports in Montgomery, Alabama
Recurring sporting events established in 2007
Recurring sporting events disestablished in 2016
2007 establishments in Alabama
2016 disestablishments in Alabama